Baher Azmy is an American lawyer and professor of law at Seton Hall University, specializing in constitutional law.

Education
Azmy received his Juris Doctor from New York University School of Law, an MPA from Columbia University, and a BA from University of Pennsylvania.

Career
After law school Azmy clerked for Dolores K. Sloviter, Chief Judge of the Third Circuit Court of Appeals in Philadelphia.

In 2005 Azmy started working at the Center for Constitutional Rights, which provides legal assistance to communities under threat, including the prisoners held in extrajudicial detention in the Guantanamo Bay detention camps in Cuba. Azmy was the lawyer for Guantanamo captive Murat Kurnaz. Azmy shared his experiences defending Kurnaz on the Peabody Award-winning episode of This American Life entitled "Habeas Shmabeas".

See also
Mark P. Denbeaux
Seton Hall reports
Unlawful combatant

References

Year of birth missing (living people)
Living people
Guantanamo Bay attorneys
New Jersey lawyers
New York University School of Law alumni
Seton Hall University faculty
Place of birth missing (living people)
School of International and Public Affairs, Columbia University alumni
University of Pennsylvania School of Arts and Sciences alumni
American legal scholars